Unctuous may refer to:
 Unctuous (monster), a character in Big Bad Beetleborgs and Power Rangers in Space

See also
 Father Todd Unctious, character in Father Ted